John Stewart (1784–1873), of Belladrum, Inverness was a British politician.

He was a Member (MP) of the Parliament of the United Kingdom for Beverley 1826–1830.

References

1784 births
1873 deaths
People from Inverness
Members of the Parliament of the United Kingdom for English constituencies
UK MPs 1826–1830